Jesse Arreguín (born September 4, 1984) is an American politician serving as mayor of Berkeley, California. He served on the Berkeley Housing Commission and Rent Stabilization Board from 2004 to 2009 and represented District 4 on the Berkeley City Council from 2009 to 2016. He is the first Latino elected Berkeley's mayor and one of the youngest mayors in the San Francisco Bay Area. Mayor Arreguín is the president of the Association of Bay Area Governments, the Bay Area's regional planning agency. 
 
Arreguín has described himself as an "unapologetic progressive" and said he wants to "restore Berkeley to the forefront of progressive leadership on the environment and social justice."

Early life
Arreguín was born in Fresno, California, and grew up in San Francisco, California. His parents and grandparents were farmworkers. At age 9 Arreguín became involved in the campaign to change the name of Army Street to Cesar Chavez Street in the historically Latino Mission District of San Francisco. Arreguín continued to be involved through efforts against reversing the name change in 1995, described as having "campaigned tirelessly to keep one of the Mission's main thoroughfares named after his idol, Cesar Chavez." 
 
Arreguín was the first in his family to attend college, and attended the University of California Berkeley. While at UC Berkeley he served as the City Affairs Director for the Associated Students of the University of California and was elected to the Berkeley Rent Stabilization board in 2004, serving as chair until 2008.
 
Arreguín has also served on the Housing Advisory Commission, Zoning Adjustments Board, and Downtown Area Plan Advisory Committee.

Berkeley City Councilmember 
From 2008 to 2016 Arreguín served two terms as a Berkeley City Council member representing City Council District 4. On the council Arreguín drafted and passed over 300 pieces of legislation.  
 
He helped increase the city's minimum wage to $15, co-wrote the Downtown Area Plan, passed the Affordable Housing Mitigation Fee used to build affordable housing, created police reform after Black Lives Matter demonstrations, and worked to save the historic Main Post Office.

Mayor of Berkeley 
Arreguín announced his candidacy for mayor of Berkeley in October 2015. He faced seven candidates for the open seat, and was endorsed by U.S. Senator Bernie Sanders of Vermont, the Sierra Club, and the Alameda Democratic Party.
 
Arreguín won 51% of the vote after ranked-choice tabulation. At age 32 he became the second-youngest mayor in Berkeley's history. Prior to his swearing-in, Arreguín vowed as mayor-elect alongside City Council members that "Berkeley would remain a sanctuary city and continue to shield its undocumented residents from deportation." Arreguín was sworn in on December 1, 2016, and in his inaugural address said that "in light of the national election, Berkeley, now more than ever, needs to lead."

In January 2017, following the release of Donald Trump's executive orders calling for the construction of a border wall, and enforcement of immigration law including the withholding of federal funds from sanctuary cities, Arreguín released a statement along with other progressive mayors in the region opposing the "hateful and harmful policies."
 
When a talk by controversial "alt-right" commentator Milo Yiannopoulos was announced on the University of California, Berkeley campus in February 2017, Arreguín said, "Bigotry is unacceptable. Hate speech isn't welcome in our community." After violent protests caused UC Berkeley to cancel the talk, Arreguín said, "we as a city do not make a decision about inviting a speaker. We do not make a decision to cancel a speaker. This was a decision of the university."
 
In response to the same incident, Arreguín referred to Yiannopoulos as a "white nationalist," but later retracted this characterization, and instead described him as an "alt-rightist." Arreguín reportedly began receiving death threats from Yiannopoulos supporters across the country after his statements were covered by right-wing news website Breitbart News, Yiannopoulos's employer at the time.
 
With Arreguín's backing, the Berkeley City Council voted in March 2017 to divest from companies involved in constructing the proposed border wall with Mexico, becoming one of the first cities in the country to do so. The council also passed a resolution calling for the impeachment of Donald Trump, co-sponsored by Arreguín, who said, "Every day there’s a new ethical problem that warrants impeachment."
 
Arreguín reportedly again became a target of death threats when conservative commentator Ann Coulter planned to speak on the UC Berkeley campus and canceled her appearance over safety concerns in April 2017. During protests over Coulter’s appearance, Arreguín was denounced for supporting the far-left group BAMN (By Any Means Necessary), which has incited violent protests, after it became known that he had "liked" their Facebook page. In response, Arreguín said that "following or liking pages does not mean you support what that group is doing," adding, "I am not a member of BAMN, and I do not support the views and the violent actions of that group." He later unfollowed the group.
 
In May 2017 Arreguín co-sponsored the successful resolution to divest the City of Berkeley from Wells Fargo Bank in response to allegations that the bank opened fraudulent deposit accounts, the bank's financing of private prisons and the Dakota Access Pipeline.
 
After Trump's withdrawal of the United States from the Paris Agreement in June 2017, Arreguín pledged along with 350 other mayors "to uphold the Paris Agreement goals even though President Donald Trump pulled the U.S. out of the international agreement to combat climate change."
 
Following the Charlottesville Unite the Right rally, attention was brought to a far-right rally planned for August 27, 2017, in Berkeley. Ahead of the event, Arreguín stated that his office was "currently exploring all options, including whether we have the legal means to stop this rally from taking place." At a press conference with local leaders including Rep. Barbara Lee and State Sen. Nancy Skinner, Arreguín called for opponents of the rally to hold counter-demonstrations in different locations to avoid violence between groups.

Arreguín won 63% of the vote in the 2020 mayoral election, facing three other candidates.

California housing crisis 
Prior to 2020, Arreguín held NIMBY views on housing in Berkeley, but has since adopted YIMBY views, as he has been a vocal proponent of denser housing and more residential development. He helped push through legislation to eliminate single-family zoning requirements.

Arreguín used to oppose California legislation that would require cities to allow denser and taller housing near public transport centrals and ease the parking requirements cities can impose on housing developments; the legislation is intended to alleviate the housing shortage in California and reduce greenhouse gas emissions. Arreguín described the bill at the time as a "a declaration of war against our neighborhoods", saying it would remove some of cities' zoning rights and lead to unwanted density in Berkeley. In 2017 Arreguín was at the center of an effort to illegally reject housing planned for development in South Berkeley. The project, proposed by Baran Studio Architecture and owner CS Construction, was for three single-family homes and conformed to all local zoning requirements. The mayor and city council violated California state law with the vote, and the city was subsequently sued on multiple occasions. The project was eventually approved and built. The story was also the subject of a lengthy New York Times piece on the housing affordability crisis.

Other roles 
Arreguín is the president of the Association of Bay Area Governments, the Bay Area's regional planning agency and Council of Governments. He is the East Bay Alternate to the San Francisco Bay Conservation and Development Commission and serves as Vice Chair the Bay Area Regional Collaborative. He also chairs the Council's Agenda and Rules Committee, and serves on the Council's Budget and Finance Committee and 4x4 Joint Committee on Housing.

References 

Democratic Party San Francisco Bay Area politicians
Hispanic and Latino American mayors in California
Hispanic and Latino American politicians
Mayors of Berkeley, California
University of California, Berkeley alumni
Year of birth missing (living people)
Living people
Mexican-American people in California politics
1984 births